1 Avenue Sainte-Geneviève is a building in Quebec City, Quebec, Canada. Located on Avenue Sainte-Geneviève, overlooking the Governors' Garden from the south, it is the home of the United States Consulate General in Quebec City. The building also has an entrance at 2 Place Terrasse Dufferin on its eastern side.

The Governors' Garden stands on the former location of the gardens owned by Claude de Ramezay in the first half of the 18th century. He lived on nearby Notre-Dame Street.

See also
List of diplomatic missions of the United States

References

Buildings and structures in Quebec City
Buildings of the United States government
1952 establishments in Quebec